"I'm in the House" is the debut single by American DJ Steve Aoki, featuring vocals from American rapper will.i.am as his alter ego Zuper Blahq (stylized as Zuper Blahq and pronounced "super black"). The song was first released via iTunes on November 23, 2009, and was made officially available as a single on March 7, 2010. The song reached No. 29 on the UK Singles Chart and later entered the UK Dance Chart and the UK Indie Chart, peaking within the top five in each chart.

Music video
The video mixes live action with vast amounts of animation. It begins with Zuper Blahq (will.i.am) declaring that he is in the house; although not specified at this moment, it is revealed to be Steve Aoki's house. The song then applies a reverse storytelling technique about how Blahq came to be in Aoki's house, with Blahq getting lost and going to a house to ask for directions, only to find that it is the house of his good friend Aoki. They find the situation incredibly amusing and decide to write a song about the series of unusual events.

Track listing

Trivia
will.i.am announced the creation of his balaclava-wearing alter ego Zuper Blahq before this song was released, further stating that he wanted to create a full album as Zuper Blahq; he later abandoned this plan, making "I'm in the House" the only Zuper Blahq release.
The song was used in an episode of MTV's Jersey Shore.

Chart performance
The song first entered the UK Singles Chart on March 14, 2010, at number 29 and went to number 1 on the UK Indie Chart in the same week, later dropping two places to number 3 in the following week on March 21, 2010. It was number 3 on the UK Dance Chart on March 14, 2010 and went down to number 5 on March 21, 2010.

Release history

References

2009 debut singles
2010 singles
Steve Aoki songs
2009 songs
Songs written by Steve Aoki
Data Records singles
UK Independent Singles Chart number-one singles